Jeandré Leonard (born 22 June 1998) is a South African rugby union player for the  in the Currie Cup. His regular position is lock.

Leonard was named in the  side for the 2021 Currie Cup Premier Division.

References

South African rugby union players
Living people
Rugby union locks
Griquas (rugby union) players
1998 births
Pumas (Currie Cup) players